An immature teratoma is a teratoma that contains anaplastic immature elements, and is often synonymous with malignant teratoma. A teratoma is a tumor of germ cell origin, containing tissues from more than one germ cell line, It can be ovarian or testicular in its origin. and are almost always benign. An immature teratoma is thus a very rare tumor, representing 1% of all teratomas, 1% of all ovarian cancers, and 35.6% of malignant ovarian germ cell tumors. It displays a specific age of incidence, occurring most frequently in the first two decades of life and almost never after menopause. Unlike a mature cystic teratoma, an immature teratoma contains immature or embryonic structures. It can coexist with mature cystic teratomas and can constitute of a combination of both adult and embryonic tissue. The most common symptoms noted are abdominal distension and masses. Prognosis and treatment options vary and largely depend on grade, stage and karyotype of the tumor itself.

Diagnosis 
At CT and MRI, an immature teratoma possesses characteristic appearance. It is typically large (12–25 cm) and has prominent solid components with cystic elements. It is usually filled with lipid constituents and therefore demonstrates fat density at CT and MRI. Ultrasound appearance of an immature teratoma is nonspecific. It is highly heterogeneous with partially solid lesions and scattered calcifications.

Stage 
Traditionally, comprehensive surgical staging is performed via exploratory laparotomy with cytologic washings, peritoneal biopsies, an omental assessment (either biopsy or rarely a full omentectomy), and both pelvic and aortic lymph node dissection. Laproscopy is often suggested as an alternative to surgically stage patients with immature teratoma.

Ovarian cancer is staged using the FIGO staging system and uses information obtained after surgery, which can include a total abdominal hysterectomy via midline laparotomy, unilateral (or bilateral) salpingo-oophorectomy, pelvic (peritoneal) washings, assessment of retroperitoneal lymph nodes and/or appendectomy. The  AJCC staging system, identical to the FIGO staging system, describes the extent of tumor (T), the presence of absences of metastases to lymph nodes (N), the presence or absence of distant metastases (M).

Pathology 

An immature teratoma contains varying compositions of adult and embryonic tissue. The most common embryonic component identified in immature teratomas is the neuroectoderm. Occasionally, tumors may present neuroepithelium that resemble neuroblasts. Tumors may also present embryonic components such as immature cartilage and skeletal muscle of mesodermal origin. Immature teratomas composed of embryonic endodermal derivatives are rare.

Often a mature cystic teratoma is misdiagnosed as its immature counterpart due to the misinterpretation of mature neural tissue as immature. While mature neural cells have nuclei with uniformly dense chromatin and neither exhibit apoptotic or mitotic activity, immature neural cells have nuclei with vesicular chromatin and exhibit both apoptotic and mitotic activity. A recent study has identified the use of Oct-4 as a reliable biomarker for the diagnosis of highly malignant cases of immature teratomas.

Grade 
Thurlbeck and Scully devised a grading system for “pure” immature teratomas on the basis of differentiation of the cellular elements of the tumor. The proportion of immature tissue elements defines the grade of immaturity. This was later modified by Norris et al. (1976), who added a quantitative aspect to the degree of immaturity.

Karyotype 
An ovarian immature teratoma is karyotypically normal 46,XX or near-normal. Grade 1 or 2 tumors exhibit 46,XX normal karyotype, whereas grade 3 tumors show a variety of abnormal karyotypes. Though immature teratoma cells show a normal karyotype, there may still be detectable alterations in the gene level and that these aberrations may influence the stability of chromosome status.

Genetics 
Ovarian immature teratomas have been classified as among the least mutated of all solid cancers. Immature teratomas originate from germ cells that undergo one of several meiotic failures, leading to a tumor genome with high levels of copy neutral loss of heterozygosity.

Prognosis 
Though several studies have shown that size and stage of the primary tumor are related to survival, the grade of the tumor is the best determinant of prognosis prior to peritoneal spread. Once peritoneal spread has occurred, the grade of metastatic lesions or implants is the best determinant of prognosis. Multiple sections of the primary tumor and wide sampling of the implants are necessary to properly grade the tumor. In most cases, the implants are better differentiated than the primary tumors. Gliomatosis peritonei, a rare condition often associated with immature ovarian teratoma, is characterized by the presence of mature glial implants in the peritoneum. Yoon et al. (2012), reported that immature ovarian teratoma patients with Gliomatosis peritonei have larger tumors, more frequent recurrence and higher CA-125 levels than immature ovarian teratoma patients without gliomatosis peritonei.

A high degree of immaturity in the primary tumor, one that corresponds with a grade 3 diagnosis is a sign of poor prognosis. Grade 3 tumors often display chromosomal abnormalities, also an indication of poor prognosis. Tumor grade is the most important factor for relapse in immature teratomas. Vicus et al. (2011), reported that grade 2 or 3 tumors are associated with a greater chance of relapse that can be fatal, predominantly within 2 years of diagnosis. Among grade 3 patients, the stage was significantly associated with relapse.

In the past, survival rates were low for high-grade immature teratomas. Norris et al. (1976), reported a survival rate of 82% for patients with grade 1 tumors, 62% for grade 2 and 30% for grade 3 tumors. However, these results antedate the use of multi-agent chemotherapy. With the advent of multiagent chemotherapy after surgical resection, long-term remission and increased survival rates have been achieved. Pashankar et al. (2016), reported that the estimated 5-year overall survival rate for grade 3 Stage I and II disease was 91%  compared with 88% for grade 3, Stage III and IV disease.

Treatment 
Histologic grade and fertility desires of the patient are key considerations in determining treatment options. In adult women postoperative adjuvant chemotherapy is standard except for stage I /grade 1 disease. In pediatric patients, surgery alone is standard.

Surgery 
Since the occurrence of immature teratoma is very rarely bilateral, current standard of care of unilateral salpingo-oophorectomy with wide sampling of peritoneal implants. Total abdominal hysterectomy with bilateral salpingo-oophorectomy are not indicated as they do not influence outcomes. Fertility-sparing surgery in the form of unilateral salpingo-oophorectomy is the primary treatment modality in young patients. Some physicians recommend ovarian cystectomy alone, rather than a unilateral salpingo-oophorectomy for patients with an early stage low grade disease. Zhao et al. (2017), reported no significant differences in survival rates or post-operative fertility outcomes between the two treatment options. However, others caution against such an approach.

Chemotherapy 
Norris et al. (1976) observed an 18% recurrence rate in grade 2 tumors and 70% recurrence in grade 3 tumors. Gershenson et al. (1986), reported outcomes of 41 patients with Stage I-IV disease and observed recurrences in 94% of patients treated with surgery alone compared with 14% in patients treated with surgery and chemotherapy. Studies like these resulted in the recommendation to use chemotherapy for grade 2 and 3 tumors. Currently, the use of multi agent chemotherapy for adult patients with ovarian immature teratoma is standard of care except for grade 1, stage I tumors. There is considerable experience with a combination of vincristine, dactinomycin, and cyclophosphamide (VAC) given in an adjuvant setting; however, combinations containing cisplatin, etoposide, and bleomycin (BEP) are now preferred because of a lower relapse rate and shorter treatment time. While a prospective comparison of VAC versus BEP has not been performed, in well-staged patients with completely resected tumors, relapse is essentially unheard of following platinum-based chemotherapy. However, the disease will recur in about 25% of well-staged patients treated with 6 months of VAC.

See also 
Teratoma
Ovarian Cancer
Germ Cell Tumor

References

External links 

 Immature teratoma entry in the public domain NCI Dictionary of Cancer Terms

Germ cell neoplasia